Provenza is a surname. Notable people with the surname include:

 Karlee Provenza, American politician 
 Paul Provenza (born 1957), American actor, comedian, and filmmaker
 Louie Provenza, fictional character from The Closer
 "Provenza" (song), a 2022 song by Karol G